Elections to East Ayrshire Council were held on 3 May 2007, the same day as the other Scottish local government elections and the Scottish Parliament general election. The election was the first one using nine new wards created as a result of the Local Governance (Scotland) Act 2004, each ward will elect three or four councillors using the single transferable vote system form of proportional representation. The new wards replace 32 single-member wards which used the plurality (first past the post) system of election.

Election results

Note: Votes are the sum of first preference votes across all council wards. The net gain/loss and percentage changes relate to the result of the previous Scottish local elections on 1 May 2003. This is because STV has an element of proportionality which is not present unless multiple seats are being elected. This may differ from other published sources showing gain/loss relative to seats held at the dissolution of Scotland's councils. This was the first election to use the STV electoral system so only net gains/losses are shown.

Ward summary

|- class="unsortable" align="centre"
! rowspan="2" style="text-align:left;"|Ward
! %
!Cllrs
! %
!Cllrs
! %
!Cllrs
! %
!Cllrs
! %
!Cllrs
!rowspan=2|TotalCllrs
|- class="unsortable" style="text-align:center;"
!colspan=2|SNP
!colspan=2|Labour
!colspan=2|Conservative
!colspan=2|Others
!colspan=2|Independents
|-
|align="left"|Annick
|30.7
|1
|34.3
|1
|21.1
|1
|1.6
|0
|12.3
|0
|3
|-
|align="left"|Kilmarnock North
|55.7
|2
|26.7
|1
|15.8
|0
|1.9
|0
|colspan=2 
|3
|-
|Kilmarnock West and Crosshouse
|47.2
|2
|32.5
|1
|17.0
|1
|colspan=2 
|3.3
|0
|4
|-
|align="left"|Kilmarnock East and Hurlford
|39.5
|2
|45.0
|2
|7.7
|0 
|2.3
|0
|5.4
|0 
| 4
|-
|align="left"|Kilmarnock South
|44.7
|2
|47.7
|1
|5.9
|0 
|1.7
|0
|colspan=2 
|3
|-
|align="left"|Irvine Valley
|43.5
|2
|31.6
|1
|20.5
|1
|colspan=2 
|4.3
|0
|4
|-
|align="left"|Ballochmyle
|29.1
|1
|51.7
|3
|9.2
|0 
|4.2
|0
|5.8 
|0
|4
|-
|align="left"|Cumnock and New Cumnock
|26.2
|1
|60.4
|3
|9.8
|0
|3.8 
|0
|colspan=2 
|4
|-
|align="left"|Doon Valley
|26.0
|1
|49.0
|1
|8.4
|0
|colspan=2 
|16.6
|1
|3
|- class="unsortable"
!align="left"|Total
!39.2
!14
!41.1
!14
!12.8
!3
!1.7
!0
!5.2
!1
!32
|}

Ward results

Annick

Kilmarnock North

Kilmarnock West and Crosshouse

Kilmarnock East and Hurlford

Kilmarnock South

Irvine Valley

Ballochmyle

Cumnock and New Cumnock

Doon Valley

By-elections 2007–12

Ballochmyle
On 11 December 2008 Labour's David Shaw won a by-election which arose following the resignation of his party colleague Eric Jackson on 24 September 2011

Doon Valley
On 1 October 2009 a by-election was held to fill the vacancy which arose following the death of Independent Cllr James Sutherland. Moira Pirrie won the by-election for Labour

References

2007 Scottish local elections
2007